The Union of Italian Provinces (UPI) is an association dedicated to ensuring the representation of Italian provinces in technical and political matters. All provinces are part of this union, except for Trento, Bolzano and Aosta.

External links
 Official website

Political associations of Italy